This is a list of Macaronesian animals extinct in the Holocene that covers extinctions from the Holocene epoch, a geologic epoch that began about 11,650 years before present (about 9700 BCE) and continues to the present day.

Macaronesia is a collection of four volcanic archipelagos in the North Atlantic, off the coast of Africa. Macaronesia consists of the Azores (part of Portugal), Maderia (part of Portugal), the Canary Islands (part of Spain), and Cape Verde (an independent country).

Numerous animal species have disappeared from the Macaronesian islands as part of the ongoing Holocene extinction, driven by human activity.

Mammals (class Mammalia)

Rodents (order Rodentia)

Murids (family Muridae)

Birds (class Aves)

Landfowl (order Galliformes)

Pheasants and allies (family Phasianidae)

Pigeons and doves (order Columbiformes)

Pigeons and doves (family Columbidae)

Rails and cranes (order Gruiformes)

Rails (family Rallidae)

Shorebirds (order Charadriiformes)

Oystercatchers (family Haematopodidae)

Albatrosses and petrels (order Procellariiformes)

Petrels and shearwaters (family Procellariidae)

Owls (order Strigiformes)

True owls (family Strigidae)

Perching birds (order Passeriformes)

Leaf warblers (family Phylloscopidae)

True finches (family Fringillidae)

Buntings (family Emberizidae)

Reptiles (class Reptilia)

Squamates (order Squamata)

Wall lizards (family Lacertidae)

Skinks (family Scincidae)

Insects (class Insecta)

Butterflies and moths (order Lepidoptera)

Whites or yellow-whites (family Pieridae)

Possibly extinct

Gastropods (class Gastropoda)

Order Stylommatophora

Family Discidae

Possibly extinct

Family Gastrodontidae

Possibly extinct

Family Geomitridae

Possibly extinct, family Geomitridae

Family Lauriidae

Possibly extinct, family Lauriidae

Notes

References

Fauna of Macaronesia
Extinct animals of Europe